HMS Nile was one of two  battleships built for the Royal Navy during the 1880s. Late deliveries of her main guns delayed her commissioning until 1891 and she spent most of the decade with the Mediterranean Fleet. Nile returned home in 1898 and became the coast guard ship at Devonport for five years before she was placed in reserve in 1903. The ship was sold for scrap in 1912 and broken up at Swansea, Wales.

Design and description

The Trafalgars displaced ; the addition of more armour and ammunition during construction added an additional  of weight and increased their draught by a foot (0.3 m) below their designed waterline. Niles crew consisted of 537 officers and ratings in 1903 and 527 two years later. The low freeboard of the Trafalgars made them very wet and they could not maintain full speed except in a calm.

Armament and armour
The Trafalgar-class ships' main armament consisted of four breech-loading (BL)  guns mounted in two twin-gun turrets, one each fore and aft of the superstructure. Each gun was provided with 80 rounds.

Their secondary armament was originally planned to consist of eight BL  guns, but these were replaced during construction by six quick-firing (QF)  guns. 200 rounds per gun were carried by the ships. Eight QF 6-pounder  and nine QF 3-pounder  Hotchkiss guns were fitted for defence against torpedo boats. The ships carried four 14-inch (356 mm) torpedo tubes and another pair were added in August 1890.

The Trafalgars' armour scheme was similar to that of Dreadnought, although the waterline belt of compound armour did not cover the complete length of the ship and a  deck extended fore and aft of the armoured citadel to the bow and stern. Above it was a strake of  armour that covered the bases of the gun turrets. The sides of the gun turrets were 18 inches thick and the conning tower was protected by 14-inch plates.

Construction and career

Nile, named after the Battle of the Nile, was the third ship of her name to serve in the Royal Navy. She was laid down on 8 April 1886 by Pembroke Dockyard. The ship was launched on 27 March 1888 by Lady Maud Hamilton, wife of Lord George Hamilton, First Lord of the Admiralty. She was completed in July 1890, although her main guns were not delivered until the following year, at a cost of £885,718.

After delivery, she was commissioned at Portsmouth on 30 June 1891 for manoeuvres, following which she was assigned to the Mediterranean Fleet. When the battleships Victoria and Camperdown collided on 22 June 1893, Nile was next astern and it was only through the skillful manoeuvring of Captain Gerard Noel that his ship was not also involved in the collision. Nile had her 4.7-inch guns replaced by QF  guns in 1896. She came home in January 1898 to become the port guardship at Devonport, and Captain Robert Rolleston was in command in June 1902. She took part in the fleet review held at Spithead on 16 August 1902 for the coronation of King Edward VII. In February 1903, the ship was relegated to the reserve at Devonport, where she remained until she was sold on 9 July 1912 for £34,000 to be broken up at Swansea by Thos. W. Ward.

Notes and references

Bibliography

External links

HMS Nile on the Dreadnought Project

 

Trafalgar-class battleships
Ships built in Pembroke Dock
Victorian-era battleships of the United Kingdom
1888 ships